Balkanika TV or Balkanika Music Television is a Bulgarian music television, broadcasting popular music and contemporary hits from all Balkan countries. The channel was launched on August 15, 2005 and is part of a group of Fen TV. In early 2013, the television started HD broadcasting.

References 

Television in Bulgaria
Television channels in North Macedonia
Television channels and stations established in 2005